The Union Bank of Australia was an Australian bank in operation from 1837 to 1951.

It was established in London in October 1837 with a subscribed capital of £500,000. The foundation of the bank had followed a visit to England by Van Diemen's Land banker Philip Oakden with a view to forming a large joint stock bank operating across the Australasian colonies, during which time he gained the support of businessman and banker George Fife Angas who had founded the South Australian Company. The new bank absorbed Oakden's struggling Launceston-based Tamar Bank upon his return, and opened its first branch in the former Tamar Bank premises on 1 May 1838. It expanded into Victoria on 18 October 1838, when it acquired the Melbourne business of the Tasmanian Derwent Bank, which had been the first bank in the city. It then opened its first Sydney branch on 2 January 1839. In 1840, it opened its first New Zealand branch in Wellington. In its early years, it had an agreement with the original Bank of South Australia, of which Angas was also a director, not to open branches in that colony; however, an Adelaide branch was established in 1850. A Brisbane branch opened in 1858 and a branch in Perth followed in 1878.

It became the Union Bank of Australia Limited in 1880. The bank remained open throughout the economic crises of the 1890s. It acquired the Bank of South Australia in 1892. By its centenary in 1937, it had 267 branches and agencies through Australia and New Zealand.

It merged with the Bank of Australasia to form the Australia and New Zealand Bank Limited in 1951.

Historic former branches
A number of the bank's former branches are now heritage-listed. These include:
 the Orange, New South Wales branch
 the Albany, Western Australia branch
 the first Fremantle, Western Australia branch
 the second Fremantle, Western Australia branch
 the Maryborough, Queensland branch
 the Rockhampton, Queensland branch
 the Townsville, Queensland branch

References

Defunct banks of Australia
Banks established in 1837
Banks disestablished in 1951
Australia and New Zealand Banking Group
1951 mergers and acquisitions